Nebtu was an ancient Egyptian, the wife of Thutmose III.

She was depicted on a pillar in Thutmose's tomb KV34 where the pharaoh leads a procession of his family members – his two Great Royal Wives Merytre-Hatshepsut and Satiah, his wife Nebtu and his daughter Nefertari. The names of Satiah and Nefertari are followed by maa kheru, showing that they were already deceased when the tomb was made. Unlike the name of the other two wives, Nebtu's name is not enclosed in a cartouche.

She had an estate, the steward of which, Nebamun was buried in TT24.

References

15th-century BC Egyptian women
Queens consort of the Eighteenth Dynasty of Egypt
Wives of Thutmose III